The 2010–11 OB I bajnokság season was the 74th season of the OB I bajnokság, the top level of ice hockey in Hungary. Seven teams participated in the league, and Alba Volan Szekesfehervar won the championship.

First round

Second round

Playoffs

Semifinals 
Alba Volán Székesfehérvár - Miskolci Jegesmedve Jégkorong Sport Egyesület 3:0 (7:6 SN, 9:1, 8:3)
Budapešť Stars - Dunaújvárosi Acélbikák 2:3 (4:0, 1:2, 4:2, 2:5, 2:3)

Final 
Alba Volán Székesfehérvár - Dunaújvárosi Acélbikák 4:0 (2:1, 5:2, 7:4, 9:4)

OB I bajnoksag seasons
Hun
OB